Unionport is an unincorporated community in Union Township, Randolph County, in the U.S. state of Indiana.

History
Unionport was platted in 1837. The community took its name from Union Township. A post office was established at Unionport in 1878, and remained in operation until it was discontinued in 1902.

Geography

References

Unincorporated communities in Randolph County, Indiana
Unincorporated communities in Indiana